The 2013–14 Gibraltar Premier Division (known as the Argus Insurance Premier Division for sponsorship reasons) is the 115th season of the national amateur football league in Gibraltar since its establishment - the highest level of football in Gibraltar. The league was expanded this season, and will be contested by eight clubs, a requirement for entry into UEFA competitions. The season began on October 7, 2013 with Glacis United defeating Lions Gibraltar 3-2. Lincoln are the defending league champions, having sealed their 11th successive title win in 2012-13.

Season summary
The 2013-14 season of the Gibraltar Premier Division, the first since the GFA's acceptance into UEFA, began on October 7, 2013 with Glacis United defeating Lions Gibraltar 3-2. The two sides had finished level on points the previous season at the bottom of the table but remained in the division thanks to the league's expansion from 6 to 8 teams in order to meet the minimum requirements for entry into UEFA competitions. Reigning champions and heavy favourites Lincoln got off to a slow start, being held 0-0 and 1-1 in their opening fixtures to Lynx and College Europa, respectively. Both sides proved early season surprise packages and occupied the top two places for the majority of the early part of the season. The mid season break saw the first edition of the Gibraltar Premier Cup in which Lincoln came out victorious after defeating Manchester 62 in the final. Following this both sides continued long lasting unbeaten runs to reach the top two positions in the table, with Lincoln yet to suffer defeat as of March 31, 2014.

At the other end of the table, two sides suffered mass exoduses in pre-season and struggled for form as a result. St Joseph's, 2012-13 league runners up and reigning Rock Cup champions, saw themselves in particular trouble while the struggle to keep players meant that newly promoted Gibraltar Phoenix, who failed to pick up a single point in their first 10 games, were left struggling to even field a starting 11 by December. In the March 28 game between Lincoln and College Europa, an explosion caused a floodlight failure with 12 minutes to go and saw the match abandoned at 3-2 to the Red Imps. Because Victoria Stadium is the only current stadium in Gibraltar, evening games the rest of the weekend, including the game between St Joseph's and Glacis United, were postponed. However, daytime games including Lions Gibraltar's 1-0 victory over a much improved Gibraltar Phoenix, were permitted to go ahead. Both Lincoln and College Europa have appealed to replay the abandoned game. On April 2, the final 12 minutes were played out with 4-2 the result. Gibraltar Phoenix were relegated on April 7, 2014 after a 5-0 defeat to Manchester 62, having lost all 12 games of the season up to that point. Lincoln secured their title win with a 4-1 victory over Lions Gibraltar on April 14.

Teams

After the 2012–13 season, no teams were relegated due to the expansion of the league. College Europa and Gibraltar Phoenix were promoted from the Second Division as champions and runners up, respectively.

European qualification
This will be the first season of the league since Gibraltar were accepted as full members of UEFA. Gibraltar has been allocated one place in the 2014–15 UEFA Champions League, provided the qualifying club has received a UEFA licence.

Personnel and kits

Note: Flags indicate national team as has been defined under FIFA eligibility rules. Players may hold more than one non-FIFA nationality.

League table
The Europa League qualifying spot was unconfirmed after the cup and league finished. UEFA regulations suggested College Europa as Cup runners-ups. GFA promised the spot to the league runners-up pre-season. Eventually College Europa were awarded the spot.

Results 
Teams in the 2013-14 season will play each other twice, with the season starting on October 7, 2013 and ending on May 7, 2014.

Relegation play-off
St Joseph's won and remained in the Premier Division.

Top goalscorers

References

External links
Season at soccerway.com

Gibraltar Premier Division seasons
Gib
1